This is a list of Wichita State Shockers football players in the NFL Draft.

Key

Selections

References

Wichita State

Wichita State Shockers NFL Draft